Farcana is a game development studio and an eponymous gaming metaverse. Farcana's headquarters are located in Dubai, UAE.

History 
Farcana operates two entities, Farcana Studio, the game development, and Farcana Labs, the scientific arm and DeSci platform inside its gaming metaverse. In March 2022, Albert Duraev and Khamzat Chimaev, the UFC superstars, became Farcana's ambassadors.

On the 10th of November, Farcana metaverse was presented to the public to test out.

Gameplay 
Farcana is a gaming metaverse and immersive shooter game built on blockchain and Unreal Engine 5. The game lore takes place on Mars, where the Earth's resources are depleting, and mankind sent expeditions to the Red Planet to hunt for Infilium, a powerful and scarce energy source.

References 

Video game development companies